Nechayevka is a rural locality (a settlement) in Sverdlovsky Selsoviet, Khabarsky District, Altai Krai, Russia. The population was 6 as of 2013. It was founded in 1908. There are 2 streets.

Geography 
Nechayevka is located 44 km southeast of Khabary (the district's administrative centre) by road. Sverdlovskoye is the nearest rural locality.

References 

Rural localities in Khabarsky District